Janeya Griffin is the founder of Commercializer LLC, a strategic consulting firm that collaborates with entrepreneurs and institutions to actualize intellectual property and the technology transfer specialist for the National Aeronautics and Space Administration (NASA).

Biography 
Griffin grew up in San Bernardino, CA and graduated from Grambling State University with degrees in Criminal justice and Chemistry with a concentration in Forensic science.  She is a member of Delta Sigma Theta Sorority, Inc.

Griffin holds two Bachelor of Science degrees and a certification in Entrepreneurial Technology Commercialization from California State University, San Bernardino. She has consulting experience as a business consultant with the Naval Surface Warfare Center – Crane division, Emerging Growth Enterprise, LLC, and at Innovation Economy Connect.

References 

American women in business
Year of birth missing (living people)
Living people